Mother Love (French: La chaleur du sein) is a 1938 French comedy drama film directed by Jean Boyer and starring Michel Simon, Arletty and Gabrielle Dorziat. It was based on a play by André Birabeau.

It was shot at Pathe's Francoeur Studios in Paris. The film's sets were designed by the art director Jacques Colombier.

Synopsis
The eighteen-year-old son of a celebrated, widowed archaeologist attempts to commit suicide while his father is away on an expedition in Egypt due to being spurned by a cabaret performer. His three prospective stepmothers all gather at his bedside, each demonstrating a possessive attitude.

Cast
 Michel Simon as Michel Quercy
 Arletty as Bernadette Mezin
 Gabrielle Dorziat as Adrienne
 Pierre Larquey as Raoul Dalaciaud - le patron de Gilbert 
 Jean Pâqui as Gilbert Quercy
 Jeanne Lion as Mathilde
 Jane Loury as Augustine 
 Monique Joyce as Joan Bouvreuil
 Gisèle Préville as La jeune fille
 Andrée Prévot as La jolie passagère
 Henri Vilbert as Le barman du paquebot
 François Périer as Batilly
 Marguerite Moreno as L'Américaine sur le paquebot

References

Bibliography 
 Dayna Oscherwitz & MaryEllen Higgins. The A to Z of French Cinema. Scarecrow Press, 2009.

External links 
 

1938 films
French drama films
1938 drama films
1930s French-language films
Films directed by Jean Boyer
Films shot at Francoeur Studios
1930s French films

fr:La chaleur du sein